Eardington Halt, originally named Eardington, is a closed railway station on the Severn Valley Railway near Eardington, south of Bridgnorth, in Shropshire.

History
Eardington opened on 1 June 1868, six years after the opening of the Severn Valley line, mainly to serve the nearby Upper Forge and Lower Forge iron works. It was not readily accessible from the nearby villages of Chelmarsh and Eardington, and on 1 April 1949 was reduced to unstaffed status, although never deemed a halt. The station had a brick waiting room and single platform.

In the later years under British Railways control, Eardington had much of its custom from fishermen at weekends and during the summer months. Although mistakenly thought by some people to have been closed as part of the Beeching axe in 1963 Eardington's planned closure pre-dated his report.

Preservation
When the Severn Valley Railway re-opened in preservation on 23 May 1970, Eardington was the only intermediate stop between Bridgnorth and Hampton Loade, resulting in its being renamed Eardington Halt. It was initially used for watering locomotives, having a ready supply of better quality water than Bridgnorth.  The Halt closed temporarily for repair work in October 1979, and briefly reopened in 1981 before being finally deleted from the timetable in 1982. It has not been used in regular service since because of poor custom, land slippage and the fact that the station is situated on a 1 in 100 gradient. Another problem is the combination of the shortness of the platform face, normal SVR practice of marshalling the guard's compartment in the centre of the train and the arched overbridge immediately to the north of the platform, which would prevent the traincrew from being able to see the guard if the train was stopped with the guard's van on the platform, as is correct practice.

The siding is now used for the storage of permanent way vehicles. A small band of volunteers have occasional "work-ins" to keep the station environs tidy.

There have recently been calls to restore the station for use on gala weekends and such. This has happened previously, during the Autumn 1998 steam gala, when the Hampton - Bridgnorth local called in each direction, despite not being booked to stop.

There are plans to reinstate the original platform which had been removed in 1980s. The current platform face dates from the 1893 extension.

References

Further reading

Disused railway stations in Shropshire
Former Great Western Railway stations
Railway stations in Great Britain opened in 1868
Railway stations in Great Britain closed in 1963
Railway stations in Great Britain opened in 1970
Railway stations in Great Britain closed in 1982
Severn Valley Railway
1868 establishments in England